Charles Binet-Sanglé (4 July 1868 – 14 November 1941)  was a French military doctor and psychologist, who notably was the first to publicly question the mental health of Jesus, which he did in his book La Folie de Jésus.

His other most influential work, Le Haras Humain (The Human Stud-Farm) suggested that euthanasia was necessary in some cases, and that a eugenic institute must be founded to encourage education of the improvement for the human race. The book was heavily censored in France.

He was decorated Knight of the Legion of Honour in 1912 and promoted Officer of the same order in 1922.

Notes

French military doctors
French psychologists
Officiers of the Légion d'honneur
People from Nièvre
1868 births
1941 deaths